Vadod may refer to the following places in Gujarat state, western India:

 Vadod, Kathiawar, a village on Saurashtra peninsula
 Vadod State, a former Rajput princely state in Gohelwar prant, with seat in the above town 
 a village in Anand Taluka in Anand District
 a village in Choryasi Taluka in Surat District
 a village in Daskroi Taluka in Amdavad District